Walkin' on Air is a 1987 album from Norwegian pop duo Bobbysocks. Within four days, the album sold 50,000 copies, and was certified gold in Norway. It was to be the duo's final album.

The songs chosen as lead singles were "If I Fall" in Norway (peaking at Nº 5 on Norsktoppen) and "Don't Leave Me Here Without You" in Sweden. Aside "If I Fall", other album songs that made it into the Norsktoppen were "Daddy's Comin' Home" (Nº 7) and "I Believe in Love" (Nº 9).

The title track was written and originally recorded by Stephen Bishop for the film, The Boy Who Could Fly, released the previous year.

Track listing
I Believe in Love
More than I Can Say
If I Fall
I Don't Speak the Language
Walkin' on Air
Daddy's Comin' Home
Don't Leave Me Here Without You - Elisabeth
I've Got Your Heart
When I See Your Eyes
Love Me Tonight - Hanne

Charts
Album

Certification

References

1987 albums
Bobbysocks! albums